Carnwath may refer to:

Carnwath, moorland village on the southern edge of the Pentland Hills of South Lanarkshire, Scotland
Carnwath (surname)
Carnwath Farms Historic Site & Park, 99.7 acre estate turned park in Wappinger, New York, US
Carnwath railway station, railway station in Carnwath
Earl of Carnwath, title in the Peerage of Scotland